The Communauté de communes Lisieux Pays d'Auge is a former communauté de communes located in the Calvados département of northwestern France. It was created in January 2003. It was merged into the Lintercom Lisieux - Pays d'Auge - Normandie in January 2013, which was merged into the new Communauté d'agglomération Lisieux Normandie in January 2017. In 2004, it had a population of 36,085 inhabitants.

The Communauté de communes comprised the following communes:

Beuvillers
La Boissière
Coquainvilliers
Courtonne-la-Meurdrac
Courtonne-les-Deux-Églises
Glos
Hermival-les-Vaux
La Houblonnière
Lessard-et-le-Chêne
Lisieux
Le Mesnil-Eudes
Le Mesnil-Guillaume
Le Mesnil-Simon
Les Monceaux
Ouilly-le-Vicomte
Le Pré-d'Auge
Prêtreville
Rocques
Saint-Désir
Saint-Germain-de-Livet
Saint-Jean-de-Livet
Saint-Martin-de-la-Lieue
Saint-Martin-de-Mailloc
Saint-Pierre-des-Ifs

References 

Lisieux Pays d'Auge